Barzok (also Romanized as Barzak; also known as Barzūk)  is a city and capital of Barzok District, in Kashan County, Isfahan Province, Iran.  At the 2006 census, its population was 3,211, in 936 families.

Rose water is produced in the city.

References

Populated places in Kashan County

Cities in Isfahan Province